Waxiang is a divergent variety of Chinese, spoken by the Waxiang people, an unrecognized ethnic minority group in the northwestern part of Hunan province, China. Waxiang is a distinct language, very different from its surrounding Southwestern Mandarin, Xiang Chinese and the Hmongic Qo Xiong languages.

Classification

As noted by Laurent Sagart (2011) and others, Waxiang appears to share some words with the Caijia language of western Guizhou. Sagart (2011) considers Caijia to be a sister of Waxiang. Currently, Waxiang is classified as a divergent Chinese variety rather than a non-Sinitic language. Similarities among Old Chinese, Waxiang, Caijia, and Bai have also been pointed out by Wu & Shen (2010).

Qu & Tang (2017) show that Waxiang and Miao (Qo Xiong) have had little mutual influence on each other.

Distribution
Waxianghua is found in Luxi, Guzhang and Yongshun counties in Xiangxi Tujia and Miao Autonomous Prefecture,  Zhangjiajie prefecture-level city (in Dayong ), and Chenxi, Xupu and Yuanling counties in Huaihua prefecture-level city. Neighboring languages include Southwestern Mandarin, Xiang Chinese, Tujia, Qo Xiong, and Hm Nai.

 means 'speech' in Mandarin Chinese,
 means 'rural' in Mandarin Chinese
 means 'speech' in Southern Chinese dialects.

The word   is only a phonetic transcription.

Wu & Shen (2010) report Waxianghua to be spoken in the following villages.
Yuanling County: Qingshuiping , Maxipu , Taichang , Wusu , Liangshuijing 
Luxi County: Basheping , Shangbao , Liangjiatan , Baisha 
Guzhang County: Linchang  of Gaowangjie , Gaofeng  (in Taojin , Beishuiping , etc.), Yantouzhai , Shanzao , Yezhu , Hepeng , Caotan 
Chenxi County: Tianwan , Banqiao , Chuanxiyi , Tanjiafang 
Xupu County: Rangjiaxi , Daweixi , Muxi 
Yongshun County: Limin , Zhenxi , Xiaoxi  of Wangcun Township 

Liubaohua , a dialect closely related to Waxianghua, is spoken in several villages in southeastern Guazhang County (including in Shaojitian Village , Shanzao Township ) and parts of Luxi County. Liubaohua is spoken in the following locations (Zou 2013).
Guzhang County
Shanzao Township : Huoma , Gaozhai , Shaojitian , Modao 
Yantouzhai Township : Yinping , Zimuping , Wangouxi , etc.
Luxi County: Basheping Township 
Yuanling County: Maxipu Town  and Shaojiwan Town

Conservative features
Waxiang preserves a number of features of Old Chinese not found in most modern varieties of Chinese, such as the initial *l- (which became a voiced dental stop in Middle Chinese):
 Guzhang li6,  OC (Baxter–Sagart)  > MC  > Mandarin  'earth, ground'
 Guzhang lu6,  OC  > MC  > Mandarin  'big'
 Guzhang li2,  OC  > MC  > Mandarin  'slow'
 Guzhang luʔ8,  OC  > MC  > Mandarin  'read'
 Guzhang za2,  OC  > MC  > Mandarin  'pear tree, pear'
 Guzhang zɛ2,  OC  >  > MC  > Mandarin  'come'
In a number of words, Waxiang and Proto-Min have affricate initials where Middle Chinese has sy-:
 Guzhang tsu3, pMin B,  OC  > MC  > Mandarin  'water'
 Guzhang tɕiəu1, pMin A,  OC  > MC  > Mandarin  'writing'
In some words, Waxiang and Proto-Min have voiced affricates where Middle Chinese has y-:
 Guzhang dzoŋ3, pMin B,  OC  > MC  > Mandarin  'itch'

Waxiang and Caijia
Sagart argues that Waxiang and Caijia together constitute the earliest branching of Chinese.
Waxiang and Caijia also share two words not found in other Chinese varieties:
'two': Caijia , Waxiang , from Old Chinese   'twice'
'milk': Caijia , Waxiang , which Sagart suggests is a non-Sinitic word

See also
Badong Yao language
Yeheni language

References

Further reading

 Hilary Chappell (2012), "Typology of an isolated Sinitic language: Waxiang, a language of northwestern Hunan, China" (presentation slides), keynote at 45th International Conference on Sino-Tibetan Languages and Linguistics.
 
Yang Wei [杨蔚]. 1999. A study of Yuanling Xianghua [沅陵乡话研究]. Changsha: Hunan Educational Press [湖南敎育出版社].
Yang Wei [杨蔚]. 2010. Xianghua comparative phonology [湘西乡话语音研究]. Guangzhou: Guangdong Press [广东省出版集团].

Yuanling County
Varieties of Chinese
Sino-Tibetan languages